La Boudeuse is the modern title given to an oil on canvas painting in the Hermitage Museum, Saint Petersburg, by the French Rococo painter Antoine Watteau (1684–1721). Completed in the late 1710s, La Boudeuse depicts a young couple set amidst a park in the foreground, in a rare example of the two-figure landscape composition which is considered one of the best fêtes galantes in Watteau's later work. However, the picture's authenticity was also a subject of scholarly debate, for it had been engraved by English painter Philippe Mercier, once a follower of Watteau, and was not included in Jean de Jullienne's edition of Watteau's work published in the 1730s.

Since the mid-18th century, La Boudeuse was among collections formed by the British statesman Robert Walpole, and later by his son, the writer Horace Walpole; until the sale of 1842, it was located in Horace Walpole's estate, Strawberry Hill House. Following a number of sales in the middle of the 19th century, the painting came into possession of prominent Russian art collector, Count ; after the Revolution of 1917, La Boudeuse was transferred into the Hermitage Museum, where it remains.

Provenance 
The painting's known provenance, researched since the 1960s in the West and Russia respectively, establishes that after Watteau's death, La Boudeuse was already in England, owned by London-based dealer Salomon Gautier, a close acquaintance of Roger de Piles; in the 1726 sale catalogue of Gautier's collection, La Boudeuse appears to be the painting under lot 34 described as "a Man and a Woman sitting, Watteau." Some time later, after 1736, La Boudeuse came into possession of Sir Robert Walpole, the first British Prime Minister; as part of the Walpole collection, the painting probably hung either in the home of the Prime Minister at 10 Downing Street or in the Walpoles' country estate at Houghton Hall. Upon Robert Walpole's death in 1745, his collections, except those at Houghton Hall, were put on a sale in London in 1748; La Boudeuse was lot 52 on day two of the sale, when it was bought back by Sir Robert Walpole's son, the writer Horace Walpole, who paid three pounds, three shillings. La Boudeuse soon entered the holdings of Horace' estate, Strawberry Hill House. In Strawberry Hill House, the painting was present in the Tribune (also called the Cabinet), notably depicted in watercolours by John Carter and Edward Edwards; it has also been mentioned in Walpole's A Description of the Villa, having the same description as in the 1726 sale catalogue.

La Boudeuse formed part of the Strawberry Hill collection until 1842, when it has been dispersed in the month-long "Great Sale"; on the 13th day of the sale, a certain Emery, who lived in London at 5 Bury Street, bought La Boudeuse for thirty nine guineas. Not long after, it came into possession of Charles de Morny, the half-brother of the future Emperor Napoleon III. After a decade in the comte de Morny's collection, the painting — now known as La Conversation — was sold at auction for 1,700 francs on 24 May 1852 to the certain Henri Didier, who, in turn, didn't kept the picture for long; it then passed to Charles de Ferrol, a Parisian dealer who similarly had the painting for a brief time and sold it at auction for 2,600 francs on 22 January 1856.

Some time after Ferrol's sale, La Boudeuse belonged to the comte de Morny's agent Jean-Jacques Meffre (1804–1865), from whom it has been bought for 5,000 francs in 1859 by Russian noble ; along with other items, La Boudeuse was first presented to the Russian public on a exhibition organised by Stroganov in 1861 at the Imperial Academy of Arts, Saint Petersburg. As part of Stroganov's collection, La Boudeuse — described as Scéne champêtre in the collection inventory compiled by Meffre and Gustav Friedrich Waagen — was placed in his mansion in Saint Petersburg at Sergievskaya Street, present in the Green Drawing Room, a reception room at the mansion's upper floor where the collection's most notable items were also held; in an 1875 essay on Stroganov's mansion, the writer Dmitry Grigorovich — a close friend and advisor of Stroganov — refers to La Boudeuse as "a declaration of love in the garden." La Boudeuse was the sole Watteau painting in Pavel Stroganov's collection, and so was in the larger Stroganov family collection.

In his will, Stroganov wished to pass La Boudeuse, among other pieces, to his younger brother , but the latter died in 1910, before the will could be properly executed; after Pavel Stroganov's death in 1911, his collection at Sergievskaya Street was succeeded by a grandnephew, Prince Georgy Shcherbatov (1896–1976). Some time later, possibly during 1917, it was relocated into the Stroganovs' main residence, the Stroganov Palace at the intersection of the Moika River and Nevsky Prospect. Following the revolution that year, the Stroganov collections were nationalised; the Stroganov Palace was reformed into a state museum, with La Boudeuse forming its part. Following theft attempts in Winter 1919–1920, a number of paintings, including La Boudeuse, have been transferred into the Hermitage Museum out of security concerns. Initially a temporary decision, the transfer turned out to be a permanent one, following the shutdown of the Stroganov Palace as museum in the late 1920s. Since then, La Boudeuse forms part of the Hermitage Museum permanent exhibition; it is on view in Room 284, formerly the second room of military pictures in the Winter Palace.

Dating 
In the 1912 album and catalogue, the German historian  attributed La Boudeuse to ca. 1716–1718, placing it in relation to two versions of The Embarkation for Cythera. In the 1950s, Jacques Mathey has dated it c. 1715, placing to the same year with The Embarrassing Proposal. Nemilova dated the painting ca. 1718 on stylistic grounds; given its provenance within the Walpoles' collections, Nemilova and other, notably Russian, critics speculated that Watteau might have painted it some time before or during his English trip, usually dated ca. 1719–1720; on that ground,  preferred a c. 1720 dating. In a 1968 catalogue raisonné,  places La Boudeuse to c. 1715, while not accepting Watteau's authorship; later in 1980, Marianne Roland Michel attributed it to ca. 1715–1716. Rosenberg has attributed the painting to c. 1717, yet found Nemilova's dating quite convincing. Later authors, such as Renaud Temperini and Guillaume Glorieux, attribute the painting to ca. 1715–1717 and c. 1715, respectively.

Related works

Watteau's paintings and drawing 
There are two surviving works by Watteau which have been compared to La Boudeuse, The Feast of Love, now in the Alte Meister Gallery, Dresden, and The Pleasures of the Ball, now in the Dulwich Gallery, London. In The Feast of Love, a male figure appears to fully repeat that found on the Hermitage painting, save for his clothes' colour; there is also a similar character in Entretiens amoureux, a presumably lost painting known through a print by Jean-Michel Liotard, the twin brother of prominent pastelist Jean-Étienne Liotard. In The Pleasures of the Ball, a woman is shown wearing a black gown with the long slashed slevees.

The only one drawing by Watteau that has been associated with La Boudeuse is a red chalk study of the man's head wearing a beret ( 749;  332), dated c. 1715, and now located in the Louvre. In Parker and Mathey's catalogue, the drawing was considered to be a preliminary study for both La Boudeuse and The Feast of Love, but Nemilova dismissed that opinion, saying that the Louvre drawing is not related with the Hermitage painting in any way; similarly, National Gallery of Art curator Margaret Grasselli questioned if the drawing could be related to the Dresden painting. Rosenberg, who did not consider the drawing to be "a true preparatory study in the strict sense of the term", only related the drawing with The Feast of Love; in a 1996 catalogue raisonné, he and Louis-Antoine Prat also concluded the drawing to be barely related to the painting, given the sitter's youthful appearance, different from that on the painting. In A Watteau Abecedario, Eidelberg stated that the sheet was trimmed on at least three sides, and presumed that the drawing was part of a larger study which could contain other studies from the same model, so the differences between the present drawing and the painted figure — the beret and feather are at a slightly different angle in the painting, and less of the left cheek is visible — can be explained.

Philippe Mercier's print and attribution debate 
La Boudeuse was etched by English painter Philippe Mercier c. 1725. Pierre-Jean Mariette, who knew the print, gives a mention of it in his manuscripts: "Une femme assise dans un jardin ayant derrière elle, un homme qui lui parle, gravé par Pierre [sic] de Mercier." Like others etchings by Mercier after Watteau, La Boudeuse was not featured in the Recueil Jullienne, — though some authors claimed the contrary — possibly out of commercial reasons.

Mercier, whose early art has been influenced by that of Watteau following their acquaintance in the late 1710s, produced his own fêtes galantes based on Watteau's inventions. Following this discovery, La Boudeuse, which authenticity was not previously questioned mostly due to its obscurity, was attributed to Mercier by Vuaflart and Jacques Herold, who claimed that Mercier copied figures from another composition by Watteau, Les Agrémens de l’esté.

Vuaflart and Herold's attribution, as well as poor quality of reproductions in Zimmermann's 1912 album, caused a scholarly debate, with some of Watteau scholars — including Robert Rey, Hélène Adhémar, and Ettore Camesasca — having adopted it, while the most of them — including Gilbert W. Barker, Hans Vollmer, Charles Sterling, Jacques Mathey, and Inna Nemilova. — stayed at the traditional attribution. Though Eidelberg's analysis of the painting, along with tracing its provenance, also confirmed Watteau's authorship on stylistic grounds, there were some reservations, notably from Jean Ferré, Robert Raines, and Donald Posner who proposed the painting to be a collaboration of Watteau and Mercier at best, with the latter responsible for the figures.

Exhibition history

Notes

References

Bibliography 

 
 
 
 
 
 
 
 
 
 
 
 
 
 
 
 
 
 
 
 
 
 
 
 
 
 
 
 
 
 
 
 
 
 
 
  For the original French edition, see .
 
 
 
  For the original Russian text, see .
 
 
 
 
 
 
 
  For the English edition, see .
 
 
 
 
 
 
 
 
 
 
 
 
 
  Cat. no. 417.

External links
 La Boudeuse at the Hermitage Museum official website
 La Boudeuse at the Horace Walpole's Strawberry Hill exhibition website
 La Boudeuse (A Capricious Woman) at the Web Gallery of Art

Paintings by Antoine Watteau
Paintings in the collection of the Hermitage Museum
1710s paintings